Olga Helen Fowler Dickie (28 August 1900 – 7 March 1992) was a British and later Australian actress best known for her numerous film roles, especially in the horror and suspense genre, and radio announcer.

Life and career
Dickie was born in British India, to Scottish parents, on 28 August 1900. After living in the UK, and working as a radio announcer, she subsequently appeared in British film productions in cameo type roles from 1949 until 1964 and was best known for her role as Gerda in the English version of Dracula starring Sir Christopher Lee in 1958. She emigrated to Australia, where she had roles in TV series and television films from the 1970s onwards, including A Country Practice, Return to Eden and The Flying Doctors, and in film such as Picnic at Hanging Rock and a 1987 adaptation of Neville Shute's  The Far County.

Dickie was married to British actor Patrick Susands  in 1927 and divorced, she married Erik Ernest Swann from 1942 until his death in 1982; she died on 7 March 1992, aged 91, in Sydney, Australia.

Selected filmography

References

External links
 

1900 births
1992 deaths
British film actresses
British television actresses
20th-century British actresses
British emigrants to Australia
British radio personalities